Hleb Harbuz (born 17 March 1994) is a Belarusian handball player for HC Kriens-Luzern and the Belarusian national team.

He participated at the 2018 European Men's Handball Championship.

References

1994 births
Living people
Sportspeople from Minsk
Belarusian male handball players
Expatriate handball players
Belarusian expatriate sportspeople in Russia
Belarusian expatriate sportspeople in Ukraine
HC Motor Zaporizhia players